53rd meridian may refer to:

53rd meridian east, a line of longitude east of the Greenwich Meridian
53rd meridian west, a line of longitude west of the Greenwich Meridian